Aleksander-Rudolf Toomel (14 June 1888 Jõhvi Parish, Virumaa – 17 November 1941 Kirov, Russia) was an Estonian politician. He was a member of III Riigikogu.

References

1888 births
1941 deaths
Members of the Riigikogu, 1926–1929